The Ogun prison break was an attack on the Sagamu minimum prison in the southwestern Nigerian city of Ogun State by Prisoners. The attack occurred on 4 January 2013. About 20 prisoners escaped from the prison leaving several prison officials and prisoners seriously injured with no deaths recorded. About 4 escaped convicts were rearrested by the Armed Squad of the Prison Service. It was reported that one escaped convict returned to the prison voluntarily to serve out his short sentence

Incident
The incident was reported to have occurred on 4 January 2013 at around 3 am.
Zakari Ibrahim, the Comptroller General of the Nigerian Prisons Services who confirm the attack claimed that the cause of the prison break was unclear. The incident resulted in the removal of Omobitan, the officer-in-charge of the facility from office for negligence of duty.

See also
Lagos prison break
Prison breaks in Nigeria
Wuse Bomb Blast
Edo prison break

References

Crime in Nigeria
Prison escapes
2013 crimes in Nigeria
Ogun State
January 2013 crimes in Africa
Escapees from Nigerian detention